Dino Menardi (23 August 1923 – 2 September 2014) was an Italian ice hockey player. He competed in the men's tournament at the 1948 Winter Olympics. As a curler he competed at the 1980 European Culing Championships.

References

External links

1923 births
2014 deaths
Olympic ice hockey players of Italy
Ice hockey players at the 1948 Winter Olympics
Italian male curlers
People from Cortina d'Ampezzo
Sportspeople from the Province of Belluno